Jeev Milkha Singh (born 15 December 1971) is an Indian professional golfer who became the first player from India to join the European Tour in 1998. He has won four events on the European Tour, becoming the most successful Indian on tour. He was the first Indian golfer to break into the top 100 of the Official World Golf Ranking in October 2006. The Government of India awarded him the civilian honour of Padma Shri in 2007. He is also the recipient of 1999 Arjuna Award.

Early life
Singh was born on 15 December 1971 to Indian Olympic athlete Milkha Singh and Nirmal Saini, former captain of the Indian women's volleyball team. Singh attended Bishop Cotton School in Shimla and later went to Abilene Christian University in the United States, obtaining a degree in business and international studies in 1996.

Singh won the NCAA Division II individual golf championship in 1993 in addition to a number of amateur tournaments in the U.S.

Professional career
Singh turned professional in 1993 and his first professional win was at the 1993 Southern Oklahoma State Open, a minor local event. He played mainly in Asia, where he was a regular winner in the mid-1990s. In 1997 he finished seventh at the European Tour qualifying school, and joined the tour the following year.

He became the third golfer to receive Arjuna Award in 1999.

His best season in Europe until 2006 was in 1999, when he came 50th on the Order of Merit. He struggled with injury in the early years of the new millennium. In April 2006 he won the Volvo China Open, becoming the second Indian player to win on the European Tour after Arjun Atwal. He also won the season ending Volvo Masters, which elevated him to a final position of 16th on the Order of Merit. He finished 2006 as the winner of the Asian Tour Order of Merit and capped his season with a pair of back to back wins in Japan to become the first Indian to make the top 50 of the Official World Golf Ranking. In 2007 he became the first Indian golfer to participate in the Masters Tournament. In August 2008, Singh achieved the highest ranking for an Indian in any major event at the 2008 PGA Championship in Oakland Hills, finishing at T9, making him arguably India's best golfer ever.

Singh finished the 2008 European Tour season ranked 12th on the Order of Merit, and after winning the Barclays Singapore Open won his second Order of Merit title on the Asian Tour.

In 2009, Singh finished the WGC-CA Championship in fourth place, after leading round one.

Singh played on the Nationwide Tour in 2003. He played on the PGA Tour from 2007 to 2010, where his best finish was 4th place at the 2009 WGC-CA Championship.

Singh received India's fourth highest civil honour, the Padma Shri, in 2007.

On 15 July 2012, Singh beat Francesco Molinari in a sudden-death playoff to win the Aberdeen Asset Management Scottish Open, the week before the 2012 Open Championship. The win secured Singh a spot in the 2012 Open Championship at Royal Lytham & St Annes Golf Club as a result of finishing as the highest non-qualifier at the event. The win was also Singh's fourth career victory on the European Tour and moved him ahead of Arjun Atwal, making him the most successful Indian golfer in European Tour history.

Personal life
Singh lives in Chandigarh with wife Kudrat and their son.

Amateur wins
1993 NCAA Division II Individual Championship

Professional wins (20)

European Tour wins (4)

*Note: The 2008 Bank Austria GolfOpen was shortened to 54 holes due to rain.
1Co-sanctioned by the Asian Tour

European Tour playoff record (1–1)

Japan Golf Tour wins (4)

Japan Golf Tour playoff record (0–1)

Asian Tour wins (6)

1Co-sanctioned by the European Tour

Asian Tour playoff record (1–3)

Korean Tour wins (1)
1994 Shinhan Donghae Open

Other wins (6)
1993 (2) Southern Oklahoma State Open, Bukit Kiara Golf Championship (Malaysia)
1994 (1) Northern Indian Open
1995 (3) Thailand PGA Championship, Mahindra BPGC Open (India), Toyota Crown Open (Thailand)

Results in major championships

CUT = missed the half-way cut
"T" = tied

Summary

Most consecutive cuts made – 4 (2002 U.S. Open – 2007 U.S. Open)
Longest streak of top-10s – 1

Results in The Players Championship

"T" indicates a tie for a place

Results in World Golf Championships

QF, R16, R32, R64 = Round in which player lost in match play
"T" = tied
Note that the HSBC Champions did not become a WGC event until 2009.

European Tour professional career summary

1 Not a full Tour member in these years
As of 2013 season

Team appearances
Amateur
Eisenhower Trophy (representing India): 1988, 1992

Professional
Alfred Dunhill Cup (representing India): 1996, 1999
Dynasty Cup (representing Asia): 2003 (winners)
Royal Trophy (representing Asia): 2007, 2010, 2011, 2012 (winners)
World Cup (representing India): 2008, 2009
EurAsia Cup (representing Asia): 2016 (non-playing captain)

See also
List of golfers with most Asian Tour wins

References

External links

Indian male golfers
Asian Tour golfers
European Tour golfers
PGA Tour golfers
Japan Golf Tour golfers
Indian Sikhs
Abilene Christian University alumni
Recipients of the Padma Shri in sports
Recipients of the Arjuna Award
Sportspeople from Chandigarh
Bishop Cotton School Shimla alumni
1971 births
Living people